Alexander Sørloth (born 5 December 1995) is a Norwegian professional footballer who plays as a striker for La Liga club Real Sociedad, on loan from Bundesliga club RB Leipzig, and the Norway national team.

Club career

Rosenborg
After several years in the youth system Sørloth was rewarded with a contract by Rosenborg in July 2013. He played his first professional game for Rosenborg when he was subbed on in the second half of the Europa League first qualifying round game versus Crusaders, and it took him only 12 minutes to score his first goal, Rosenborg's 6th in their 7–2 win.

He made his debut in the Tippeligaen on 20 July 2014 in Rosenborg's home game against Sogndal coming on as a substitute for Alexander Søderlund after 60 minutes.

Sørloth went on a loan to Bodø/Glimt before the start of the 2015 Tippeligaen. In the league he scored 13 goals and making five assist in his 26 appearances (19 starters), including scoring six goals in one game against Sarpsborg 08. In his last match for Bodø/Glimt, he scored his second hat-trick of the season, against Stabæk.

Groningen
On 6 November 2015, Sørloth confirmed that he would be joining FC Groningen on a 4.5-year contract at the end of the season. Groningen paid a transfer fee of around €750,000.

Midtjylland
On 1 June 2017, FC Midtjylland announced that they had signed Sørloth on a four-year contract.

Crystal Palace
On 31 January 2018, Sørloth signed for Crystal Palace for a reported fee of £9 million. He made his debut on 10 February 2018 in a 3–1 away defeat to Everton. On Tuesday 28 August, Sørloth scored his first goal for Crystal Palace in an EFL Cup game against Swansea City with the game finishing 1–0.

Loan to Gent
On 8 January 2019, Sørloth signed for Belgian First Division A side, K.A.A. Gent on loan until the end of the 2018–19 season.

Loan to Trabzonspor
In August 2019, Sørloth signed for Turkish Süper Lig club Trabzonspor on loan until the end of the 2020–21 season.

Sørloth's first official match for Trabzonspor was against Sparta Prague in the third qualifying round of the UEFA Europa League, where he scored the second goal in a match that ended 2–2. In March 2020, Sørloth scored his first hat-trick for Trabzonspor against Kasimpasa, in a match that ended 6–0.

On 5 July 2020, Sørloth became Trabzonspor’s top-scoring foreign player in a single season, with 29 goals, passing legendary Georgian former center-forward Shota Arveladze.

RB Leipzig
After playing for his national team in the first two group matches of UEFA Nations League, Sørloth failed to return to Trabzon prior to Trabzonspor's upcoming league fixture against Beşiktaş. On 22 September 2020, Sørloth signed for RB Leipzig for an initial fee of €20 million plus €2 million in potential add-ons, with any proceeds to be shared evenly between Trabzonspor and Crystal Palace. On 2 December 2020, he scored the game-winning goal against İstanbul Başakşehir in a 4–3 win in the 2020–21 UEFA Champions League, which was his first goal for the club.

Loan to Real Sociedad
On 25 August 2021, Sørloth moved to La Liga side Real Sociedad on a season-long loan deal. On 29 August 2022, he returned to the Txuri-urdin on loan for another year.

Personal life
Sørloth is the son of former Rosenborg player and Norwegian international Gøran Sørloth.

On 31 May 2021, an Instagram post of his surpassed 3.5 million comments, making it the most commented post on Instagram by an athlete. It was mainly fans of the Turkish football club Trabzonspor, asking the player to return to his former loan club.

Career statistics

Club

International

As of match played 20 November 2022. Norway score listed first, score column indicates score after each Sørloth goal.

Honours
Rosenborg
Norwegian A-Junior Cup: 2012
Midtjylland
Danish Superliga: 2017–18
Trabzonspor
Turkish Cup: 2019–20
Individual
Süper Lig top goalscorer: 2019–20
Süper Lig Striker of the Year: 2019–20
Turkish Cup top goalscorer: 2019–20
La Liga Player of the Month: January 2023

References

External links

 Profile at the Real Sociedad website
 
 

1995 births
Living people
Footballers from Trondheim
Association football forwards
Norwegian footballers
Norway under-21 international footballers
Norway youth international footballers
Norway international footballers
Norwegian expatriate footballers
Rosenborg BK players
FK Bodø/Glimt players
FC Groningen players
FC Midtjylland players
Crystal Palace F.C. players
K.A.A. Gent players
Trabzonspor footballers
RB Leipzig players
Real Sociedad footballers
Eliteserien players
Eredivisie players
Danish Superliga players
Premier League players
Belgian Pro League players
Süper Lig players
Bundesliga players
La Liga players
Expatriate footballers in the Netherlands
Expatriate men's footballers in Denmark
Expatriate footballers in England
Expatriate footballers in Belgium
Expatriate footballers in Turkey
Expatriate footballers in Germany
Expatriate footballers in Spain
Norwegian expatriate sportspeople in the Netherlands
Norwegian expatriate sportspeople in Denmark
Norwegian expatriate sportspeople in England
Norwegian expatriate sportspeople in Belgium
Norwegian expatriate sportspeople in Turkey
Norwegian expatriate sportspeople in Germany
Norwegian expatriate sportspeople in Spain